Alistair Slater (born 11 February 1993) is a British road and track cyclist, who currently rides for British amateur team Clancy Briggs Cycling Academy.

Slater is a two-time winner of the British National Team Pursuit Championships, winning the event in 2011 and 2012.

Ali is currently a coach for Clancy Briggs Cycling Academy.

Major results
2011
 1st  Team pursuit, National Track Championships
2012
 1st  Team pursuit, National Track Championships
 5th Time trial, National Road Championships
2017
 6th Grand Prix des Marbriers
2018
 3rd Lincoln Grand Prix
 6th Overall Kreiz Breizh Elites
1st Stage 4

References

External links

1993 births
Living people
British male cyclists
British track cyclists
People from Bourne, Lincolnshire
21st-century British people